Ovulitis azaleae is a plant pathogen affecting azaleas and rhododendrons.

See also 
 List of azalea diseases
 List of rhododendron diseases

References

External links 
 Index Fungorum
 USDA ARS Fungal Database

Fungal plant pathogens and diseases
Ornamental plant pathogens and diseases
Sclerotiniaceae